Pragati Maidan railway station is a small railway station in Pragati Maidan which is a residential and commercial neighborhood of the New Delhi district of Delhi. Its code is PGMD. The station is part of  Delhi Suburban Railway. The station consist of 2 platforms.

Major trains

 New Delhi–Kurukshetra MEMU

See also

 Supreme Court metro station
 Hazrat Nizamuddin railway station
 New Delhi railway station
 Delhi Junction railway station
 Anand Vihar Railway Terminal
 Sarai Rohilla railway station
 Delhi Metro

References

External links

Railway stations in New Delhi district
Delhi railway division